John Anthony Megna (November 9, 1952 – September 5, 1995) was an American actor, director and teacher. His best known role is that of "Dill" in the film To Kill a Mockingbird.

Early life
John Anthony Megna was born in Ozone Park, Queens, New York to Ralph W. Megna, a pharmacist, and Eleanor McGinley, a one-time nightclub singer. He was a half-brother of Connie Stevens and an ex-brother-in-law of Eddie Fisher, both famous singers. He attended Holy Cross High School in Flushing, New York.

Career
At age 6, Megna made his acting debut in Frank Loesser's Broadway musical Greenwillow. At 7, he starred in All the Way Home, an adaptation of James Agee's novel about the effect of a father's death on his family. This led to his being cast as Charles Baker "Dill" Harris, the toothy young summer visitor in the 1962 film To Kill a Mockingbird. The character was based on writer Truman Capote, a childhood friend and later associate of Harper Lee, the author of the original novel.

Megna appeared in many television programs throughout the 1960s and 1970s; he portrayed a near-blind child in the Naked City episode "A Horse Has a Big Head - Let Him Worry!", one of the "Onlies" in the "Miri" episode of Star Trek: The Original Series, Stephan in I Spy (1967), and Little Adam in the NASA-produced animated shorts The Big World of Little Adam.

His other film appearances include Hush...Hush, Sweet Charlotte (1964), The Godfather: Part II (1974), The Boy in the Plastic Bubble (1976) with John Travolta, and Go Tell the Spartans (1978) with Burt Lancaster. He also acted in two car-chase films starring Burt Reynolds and directed by Hal Needham – Smokey and the Bandit II (1980) and The Cannonball Run (1981).

Later career
Megna graduated from Cornell University as a performing arts major.

As an adult, he turned to directing plays. He was the founding director of L.A. Arts, a nonprofit theater group in Los Angeles. He later became a high school English teacher, and last taught at James Monroe High School in North Hills, California. He also taught Honors English at Hollenbeck Jr High in Boyle Heights.

Personal life and death
John Megna was one of the first actors to come out as gay in the 1960s. He died from AIDS-related complications on September 5, 1995, at Midway Hospital in Los Angeles at the age of 42.

Television

 Naked City (1962) - Harold Denton
 The Alfred Hitchcock Hour - The Magic Shop (1964) (TV) - Anthony 'Tony' Grainger
 Star Trek, episode "Miri" (1966) (TV) - Little Boy
 Skag (1980) (TV)
 The Mogul (1984)

Filmography

 To Kill a Mockingbird (1962) - Dill Harris
 Hush… Hush, Sweet Charlotte (1964) - New Boy
 Blindfold (1966) - Mario Vincenti
 The Godfather Part II (1974) - Young Hyman Roth (uncredited)
 The Boy in the Plastic Bubble (1976) (TV Movie) - Smith
 I Want to Keep My Baby (1976) (TV Movie) - Andy
 Another Man, Another Chance (1977) - Loser in Saloon (uncredited)
 Go Tell the Spartans (1978) - Cpl. Ackley
 Sunnyside (1979) - B.B.
 Butch and Sundance: The Early Days (1979) - Outlaw
 Smokey and the Bandit II (1980) - P.T.
 The Cannonball Run (1981) - Arthur Rose
 The Ratings Game (1984) - Al

References

External links
 
 

1952 births
1995 deaths
Cornell University alumni
American male child actors
American male film actors
American male stage actors
American male television actors
American theatre directors
LGBT male actors
LGBT people from New York (state)
Male actors from New York City
Educators from California
People from Queens, New York
AIDS-related deaths in California
20th-century American male actors
American people of Italian descent
Educators from New York City
Holy Cross High School (Flushing) alumni